The 2016 Chicago Marathon was the 39th edition of the marathon race in Chicago, Illinois, United States and was held October 9. Over 37,000 runners took part in the marathon. Florence Kiplagat of Kenya defended her women's title with a winning time of 2:21:32 hours, while her countryman Abel Kirui took the men's race in 2:11:23 hours. The top finishing Americans were Serena Burla in seventh in the women's division and Diego Estrada in eighth in the men's.

The women's wheelchair marathon was won for a sixth consecutive time by American Tatyana McFadden in 1:42:28 hours, one second clear of Manuela Schär. Marcel Hug defeated the defending champion Kurt Fearnley in the men's race with 1:32:57 hours and also a one-second margin of victory.

Results

Men

Women

Wheelchair men

Wheelchair women

References 

Results
Chicago Marathon

2016
Chicago Marathon
Chicago Marathon
Chicago
2010s in Chicago
2016 in Illinois